Back Kwang-soo (born 4 July 1975) is a South Korean rugby union footballer. He plays at the flanker position.

He played for Korea Electric Power, in South Korea. He is one of the best players for the Korea national rugby union team and he's currently the most capped for his country with 26 matches.

External links
 rugby-japan.jp

1978 births
Living people
South Korean rugby union players
Rugby union flankers